Randor may refer to:

People 
 Randor Bierd (born 1984), American baseball player
 Randor Guy (born 1937), Indian lawyer and columnist

Fictional characters 
King Randor, a character from the Masters of the Universe franchise.
Keill Randor, the protagonist of the Last Legionary novels by Douglas Hill.

See also 
 Rander, a town in Gujarat, India